Dionicio Manuel Escalante Moreno (born 12 May 1990) is a Mexican professional footballer who plays as a defensive midfielder.

Club career
In January 2019, he moved to Atlético San Luis.

Honours
Querétaro
Copa MX: Apertura 2016

References

External links
 at Guadalajara official website 

1990 births
Living people
Mexican footballers
Sportspeople from Culiacán
Association football midfielders
C.D. Guadalajara footballers
C.F. Pachuca players
Querétaro F.C. footballers
Segunda División B players
Cultural Leonesa footballers
Mexican expatriate footballers
Mexican expatriate sportspeople in Spain
Expatriate footballers in Spain
Ascenso MX players
Atlético San Luis footballers
Liga MX players